Korea's military history spans thousands of years, beginning with the ancient nation of Gojoseon and continuing into the present day with the countries of North Korea and South Korea, and is notable for its many successful triumphs over invaders. Throughout its history, Korea has boasted numerous exceptional leaders who gained outstanding victories against numerically superior enemies. Famed leaders credited with defending Korea against foreign invasions include: Eulji Mundeok of Goguryeo, who defeated Sui China during the Goguryeo–Sui War; Yeon Gaesomun of Goguryeo, who defeated Emperor Taizong of Tang China during the Goguryeo–Tang War; Gang Gam-chan of Goryeo, who defeated the Khitan Empire during the Goryeo-Khitan War; Choe Yeong and Yi Seong-gye of Goryeo, who defeated the Red Turbans during the Red Turban Invasions; and Yi Sun-shin of Joseon, who defeated the Japanese at sea during the Imjin War. Other notable leaders include: Gwanggaeto the Great of Goguryeo, who created a great empire in Northeast Asia through conquest, and subjugated the other Korean kingdoms of Baekje, Silla and Gaya to bring about a brief unification of the Three Kingdoms of Korea; Geunchogo of Baekje, who captured Pyongyang and established overseas territories to control much of the Korean peninsula and dominate the seas; Munmu and Kim Yu-sin of Silla, who united the Three Kingdoms of Korea and defeated Tang China to gain complete control of the Korean peninsula; Dae Jo-yeong, who created Balhae from Goguryeo's ashes and reconquered Goguryeo lands lost during the Goguryeo-Tang War; Jang Bogo of Later Silla, who created a maritime empire and commanded a powerful fleet; Wang Geon, who united the Later Three Kingdoms of Korea and established Goryeo as the successor to Goguryeo; and Yun Gwan of Goryeo, who defeated the Jurchens and constructed nine fortresses in Manchuria.

Today, both North Korea and South Korea field some of the largest and most lethal armies in the world. On one hand, North Korea is widely suspected of having nuclear weapons, as well as other weapons of mass destruction. South Korea, for its part, is equipped with a sophisticated conventional military with state-of-the-art weapons. In addition, South Korean troops actively participated in the Vietnam War, contributing the second largest foreign military contingent after the United States, and are currently serving in various UN peacekeeping missions around the world. The South Korean military enjoys military alliances with other countries, particularly the United States.

Timeline

Gojoseon
 Gojoseon–Yan War - 4th century B.C.
 Han conquest of Gojoseon – 109–108 BC

Buyeo
 Mohe conquest

Proto–Three Kingdoms of Korea

Goguryeo
 Continuous battles with the Four Commanderies of Han
 Battle of Jwawon
 Xuantu Conquest – 302
 Lelang Conquest – 313
 Daifang Conquest – 314
 Gongsun Du's Campaign against Goguryeo – 190
 Goguryeo-Wei War – 244
 Xianbei Conquest
 Khitan Conquest

Baekje
 Malgal Conquest
 Conquest of Mahan by Baekje

Silla
 Conquest of Jinhan by Silla
 Campaign with Gaya

Gaya
 Campaign with Silla

Three Kingdoms Period

Goguryeo campaigns
 Campaign of Geunchogo of Baekje: Conquest of Pyongyang
 Baekje Campaign of Gwanggaeto the Great of Goguryeo
 Attack from Gwanggaeto the Great of Goguryeo
 Gaya confederacy Campaign
 Goguryeo–Yamato War
 Campaigns of Gwanggaeto the Great of Goguryeo
 Xianbei Campaign
 Malgal Conquest
 Khitan Conquest
 Buyeo Conquest

Goguryeo, Baekje–Silla Alliance War
 Campaign of Jangsu of Goguryeo against Silla and Baekje
 Invasion of Baekje–Silla alliance – 475
 Campaign of Baekje–Silla–Gaya armies against Goguryeo
 Battle of Gwansan – 554
 Gaya confederacy Annexation – 532/562

Other conflicts
 The Baekje Conquest of Tamna – 498
 The Silla Conquest of Usan – 512

Goguryeo–Sui War (598–614)
 Goguryeo–Sui War – 598

Goguryeo–Tang War (645–668)
 First conflict of the Goguryeo–Tang War – 645
 Battle of Ansi — 645
 Battle of Mount Jupil — 645
 Battle of Sasu — 662
 Battle of Geumsan — 667
Including Goguryeo and Baekje alliance against Tang and Silla

Baekje–Tang War (660–663)
 Baekje–Tang War – 660

Silla–Tang War (668–676)
 Other rebellions from Baekje and Goguryeo people
 Battle of Maeso fortress

North South States Period

Balhae
 Battle of Tianmenling – War of Foundation – 698
 Balhae expedition to Dengzhou – 732
 Balhae-Silla Conflicts
 Conquest of Balhae by Khitan – 926

Silla (676–935)
 Campaigns of Jang Bogo
 Kim Heonchang Rebellion
 Red Pants Rebellion
 Ungjin Commandery Conquest – 676
 Gyerim Territory Area Command Conquest – 735
 Protectorate General to Pacify the East Conquest – 773
 Ajagae Rebellion
 Gihwon Rebellion
 Yanggil Rebellion
 Later Three Kingdoms – 900~936

Goryeo Dynasty

Goryeo wars
 Northern Expansion of Manchuria
 Goryeo-Khitan War
 First conflict in the Goryeo–Khitan War
 Second conflict in the Goryeo–Khitan War
 Third conflict in the Goryeo–Khitan War (see also Battle of Gwiju)
 Campaigns of General Yun Gwan against the Jurchens (see also Korean-Jurchen border conflicts)
 Mongol invasions of Korea
 Sambyeolcho Rebellion
 Mongol invasions of Japan
 First Mongol invasion of Japan
 Second Mongol invasion of Japan
 Dongnyeong Conquest – 1290
 Ssangseong Conquest – 1356
 Red Turban invasions of Goryeo
 Liaoyang campaign - 1370
 War against Japanese piracy
 1st Tsushima invasion

Internal strife
 Yi Ja-gyeom Rebellion
 Myo Cheong Rebellion
 Military Coup of 1170
 Kim Bodang Rebellion
 Jo Wichong Rebellion
 Mangi and Mangsoi Rebellion
 Kim Sami and Hyosim Rebellion
 Slave rebellion by Manjeok
 Wihwado Retreat

Joseon Dynasty

Conflicts
 2nd Tsushima Conquest (Gihae Eastern expedition) – 1419
 Japanese riots in Southeast Korea (1510)
 Seven Year War (Imjin) – 1592–1598
 Northern expedition against Manchus (see also Korean-Jurchen border conflicts)
 Later Jin invasion of Joseon – 1627
 Qing invasion of Joseon – 1636
 Russian-Manchu border conflicts – 1654–1658
 French campaign against Korea
 General Sherman Incident
 United States expedition to Korea
 Ganghwa Island incident

Nationwide Internal strifes
 Yi Si-ae's Rebellion
 Yi Gwal's Rebellion
 Hong Gyeong-Rae's Rebellion
 Imo Incident
 Donghak Peasant Revolution

Korean Empire

Conflicts
 Korean invasion of Manchuria
 Namdaemun Battle

1910–1945: Colonial period
 Campaigns of Independence Forces
 Battle of Qingshanli
 Battle of Fengwudong
 Massacre of Svobodny
 Actions of Korean Liberation Army
 South-East Asian theatre of World War II

After 1945
 Korean War
 Vietnam War
 Gulf War
 War in Afghanistan
 Iraq War
 North Korea and weapons of mass destruction

See also
 History of Korea
 Military of South Korea
 Naval history of Korea
 List of battles of Korea
 War Memorial of Korea

References